The burrhead chub (Macrhybopsis marconis) is a freshwater ray-finned fish in the family Cyprinidae, the carps and minnows. It occurs in the Colorado, Guadalupe, and San Antonio river drainages in Texas. Its preferred habitat is sand and gravel runs of small to large rivers.

References

Macrhybopsis
Freshwater fish of the United States
Fish described in 1886